Jules Verne's Mysterious Island may refer to:

 Mysterious Island (1961 film), a 1961 science fiction adventure film
 Jules Verne's Mysterious Island (2010 film), a 2010 adventure film